Saint Ronan's School is an independent co-educational preparatory school for boys and girls from 3 to 13 years located in Hawkhurst in Kent, England. It currently has about 440 pupils, the majority of them day pupils, although boarding is available from Monday night through to Thursday night for all pupils from Year 4 upwards. The present headmaster is William Trelawny-Vernon. The school was named Tatler UK Prep School of the Year in 2017-2018 and TES Prep School of the Year 2021.

History
The school was founded in 1883 and was originally located in Worthing in Sussex. During the Second World War, the school was evacuated to Bicton Park near Exmouth in Devon, but afterwards moved to its present location in Tongswood House.

The house was remodelled in the late 19th century for William Cotterill, owner c. 1868 to 1892, of a mercantile family from Birmingham. Tongswood later belonged to Charles Eugene Gunther (died 1931), head of the Liebig Extract of Meat Company which later became known as OXO, who was High Sheriff of Kent in 1926.
	
Sir Richard Vassar-Smith, 3rd Baronet, was headmaster from 1957 to 1971, and was succeeded by his son, Sir John Vassar-Smith, 4th Baronet, who was headmaster of the school until his retirement in 1997.

Notable alumni

Former pupils of Saint Ronan's School include: 
 Lindsay Anderson, film and theatre director
 Julian Asquith, 2nd Earl of Oxford and Asquith, colonial administrator and hereditary peer
 Christopher Battiscombe, diplomat
 Richard Rodney Bennett, composer
 Bill Benyon, Member of Parliament
 Mark Bonham Carter, Baron Bonham-Carter,  Member of Parliament and publisher
 Raymond Bonham Carter, banker
 Robert Bray, soldier
 Richard Bridgeman, 7th Earl of Bradford, peer and restaurateur
 Nick Brown, Member of Parliament
 Patrick Chichester, 8th Marquess of Donegall, peer
 Iain Cochrane, 15th Earl of Dundonald, peer
 Sampson Collins, cricket journalist
 Peter Dickinson, author and poet
 Frank Gardner, journalist (BBC Security Correspondent)
 Michael Grylls, Member of Parliament
 Patrick Hadley, composer
 David Heathcoat-Amory, Member of Parliament
 Osbert Lancaster, cartoonist
 Laddie Lucas,  Royal Air Force officer, left-handed golfer, author and Member of Parliament 
 Donald Maclean (spy)
 Christopher Makins, 2nd Baron Sherfield, peer, Anglo-American diplomat, foreign policy expert, and author
 César Mange de Hauke, art dealer
 Airey Neave, British soldier, lawyer and Member of Parliament
 Francis Newall, 2nd Baron Newall, peer
 Martin Nourse, Lord Justice of Appeal of England and Wales
 John Palmer, 4th Earl of Selborne, British peer, ecological expert, and businessman
 Matthew Parish, olympic rower
 Thomas Ponsonby, 3rd Baron Ponsonby of Shulbrede, Chairman of the  Greater London Council, Labour Chief Whip 1982-1990
 John Raven, Classical scholar and botanist
 Sir Charles Richardson, army general
 E. Clive Rouse, archaeologist
 Charles Saumarez Smith, British cultural historian specialising in the history of art, design and architecture
 Mark Shand, travel writer and conservationist
 Philip Sidney, 2nd Viscount De L'Isle, peer
 James Simpson, naval officer and explorer
 Michael Whinney, Church of England bishop

References

External links
 Official site

Preparatory schools in Kent
Hawkhurst
Church of England private schools in the Diocese of Rochester
Educational institutions established in 1883
1883 establishments in England